The 1934–35 season was the 43rd season of The Football League.

Final league tables

The tables and results below are reproduced here in the exact form that they can be found at The Rec.Sport.Soccer Statistics Foundation website and in Rothmans Book of Football League Records 1888–89 to 1978–79, with home and away statistics separated.

Beginning with the season 1894–95, clubs finishing level on points were separated according to goal average (goals scored divided by goals conceded), or more properly put, goal ratio. In case one or more teams had the same goal difference, this system favoured those teams who had scored fewer goals. The goal average system was eventually scrapped beginning with the 1976–77 season.

From the 1922–23 season, the bottom two teams of both Third Division North and Third Division South were required to apply for re-election.

First Division

Results

Maps

Second Division

Results

Maps

Third Division North

Results

Maps

Third Division South

Results

Maps

See also
1934–35 in English football
1934 in association football
1935 in association football

References

Ian Laschke: Rothmans Book of Football League Records 1888–89 to 1978–79. Macdonald and Jane’s, London & Sydney, 1980.

English Football League seasons
Eng
1934–35 in English football leagues